Peter France, FBA, FRSE (born 1935) is a British scholar of French literature and retired academic. He was Professor of French at the University of Edinburgh from 1980 to 1990. After completing a BA and DPhil at Magdalen College, Oxford, he was appointed a lecturer in French at the University of Sussex in 1963; he was eventually promoted to a readership, before he moved in 1980 to the University of Edinburgh to take up the professorship. He left the chair in 1990 and then spent ten years as a University Endowment Fellow before retiring in 2000.

Honours and awards 
In 1989, he was elected a Fellow of the British Academy and served on the Academy's council from 1992 to 1995; in 2003, he was also elected a Fellow of the Royal Society of Edinburgh.

Publications 
France was joint editor of the Oxford History of Literary Translation in English (5 volumes, 2005–10). His other publications include:

 Racine's Rhetoric (Clarendon Press, 1965).
 Rhetoric and Truth in France (Clarendon Press, 1972).
 Poets of Modern Russia, Cambridge Studies in Modern Literature (Cambridge University Press, 1982).
 Diderot, Past Masters (Oxford University Press, 1983).
 Politeness and its Discontents: Problems in French Classical Culture, Cambridge Studies in French (Cambridge University Press, 1992).
 (Editor) The New Oxford Companion to Literature in French (Oxford University Press, 1995).
 (Editor) The Oxford Guide to Literature in English Translation (Oxford University Press, 2000).
 (Co-editor with William St Clair) Mapping Lives: The Uses of Biography (Oxford University Press for the British Academy, 2002).

References 

Living people
1935 births
Scholars of French literature
Alumni of Magdalen College, Oxford
Academics of the University of Sussex
Academics of the University of Edinburgh
Fellows of the British Academy
Fellows of the Royal Society of Edinburgh